Drum tablature, commonly known as a drum tab, is a form of simplified percussion notation, or tablature for percussion instruments. Instead of the durational notes normally seen on a piece of sheet music, drum tab uses proportional horizontal placement to indicate rhythm and vertical placement on a series of lines to represent which drum from the drum kit to stroke. Drum tabs frequently depict drum patterns.

Key or legend 
The number of lines in a specific tab will vary depending on the number of different drums used during a specific section of music. Below is an example of a basic drum kit. 
   CC|-Crash cymbal----|
   HH|-Hi-hat----------|
   Rd|-Ride cymbal-----|
   SN|-Snare drum------|
   T1|-High tom--------|
   T2|-Low tom---------|
   FT|-Floor tom-------|
   BD|-Bass drum-------|
   Hf/FH|-Hi-hat w/foot|

Techniques 
Tablature can use various letter and symbols to denote different cymbal types or other drum techniques. These are the tablature symbols that represent various techniques, though these may vary:

Cymbals 
   |-x-| Strike cymbal or hi-hat
   |-X-| Strike loose hi-hat, or hit crash hard
   |-o-| Open hi-hat
   |-#-| Choke cymbal (grab cymbal with hand after striking it)
   |-s-| Splash cymbal
   |-c-| China cymbal
   |-b-| Bell of ride
   |-x-| Click hi-hat with foot

Drums 
   |-o-| Strike
   |-O-| Accent
   |-g-| Ghost note
   |-f-| Flam
   |-d-| Drag
   |-b-| Soft one-handed roll
   |-B-| Accented one-handed roll
   |-@-| Snare rim

Example 
Below is an example of a rhythm pattern characteristic of much popular music including rock presented in standard notation and then its corresponding translation into drum tab.

B = Bass drum   HH = Hi-hat S = Snare drum
   HH|x-x-x-x-x-x-x-x-||
    S|----o-------o---||
    B|o-------o-------||
      1 + 2 + 3 + 4 +

References 
2. "How to read drum sheet music". www.midnightdrummer.com.

Percussion notation